Sister Rosemary E. Jeffries, R.S.M., Ph.D is former President of Georgian Court University (formerly Georgian Court College) (2001-2015) and Vice Chair of the New Jersey Presidents' Council Executive Board (2006-2007).

A native of Ocean City, New Jersey, Jeffries holds a PhD in sociology from Fordham University, an M.A. in religious studies from Princeton Theological Seminary, an M.A. in public communications from Fordham, and a B.A. in art education from Georgian Court College.

A Sister of Mercy, Dr. Jeffries worked for her congregation's Regional Community in Watchung, New Jersey as director of communications, director of development and public relations, a member of the leadership team, and, most recently, Vice President. She was also the Director of Communications for the Diocese of Trenton and held positions of pastoral ministry and teaching.

Affiliations
Sister Rosemary currently serves as:
 Board President of Leviticus Fund
 Member of the Catholic Charities Board of Trustees in the Diocese of Trenton
 Member of the Board of Trustees of St. Josephs College, West Hartford, Connecticut
 Secretary of the New Jersey Presidents Council
 Former member of the Tri-State Catholic Committee on Radio and Television
 Former chair of the Tri-State Advisory Board for WNET.

Publications
Jeffries has been published in numerous journals, such as Campus Technology, New Catholic World, and Horizon: Journal of the National Religious Vocation Conference.

External links
https://www.app.com/story/news/education/2015/02/06/sister-rosemary-retires/22975103/
https://web.archive.org/web/20070610064611/http://www.georgian.edu/president/more_about.htm
https://web.archive.org/web/20061217215051/http://www.state.nj.us/highereducation/MEETING_SUMMARIES/summary0503.htm
http://www.njpc.org/leadership.html

Year of birth missing (living people)
Living people
People from Ocean City, New Jersey
21st-century American Roman Catholic nuns
Fordham University alumni
Princeton University alumni
Sisters of Mercy
Georgian Court University faculty
Catholics from New Jersey
American women academics